Louis Botha became Prime Minister of the Transvaal Colony on 4 March 1907, following the results of the election of 1907, with his Het Volk Party winning 37 out of 69 seats (including three affiliated independents) to the Legislative Assembly, ahead of the Progressive Party (21 seats), the National Association (16), Labour (3 seats) and 2 independents. On the results, the Governor, The Earl of Selbourne, wrote to the Colonial Office: "The clear majority which Het Volk has won over all other parties combined, together with the defeat of Sir Richard Solomon by Sir Percy FitzPatrick, has of course made it necessary for me to send for General Botha, and I have very little doubt that he will form a Ministry consisting mainly, if not entirely, of members of his own party".

After having initially considered a fully Het Volk ministry, at the instigation of former Colonial Attorney-General, Sir Richard Solomon (who declined to serve in the cabinet and was appointed to be Agent-General in London), Botha subsequently formed a 6-member cabinet (maximum allowed) with members of the Nationalist Party, who "were all men of progressive, in some respects democratic, views, and in thus forming his cabinet General Botha showed his determination not to be dominated by the “back veld” Boers". Among the members of Het Volk who were originally considered for positions were diamond mine manager, Thomas Cullinan (Lands/Public Works) and Andries Stockenstrom (Speaker). 

The ministry was formally sworn into office in Parliament Hall, Pretoria by the Governor, The Earl of Selborne, on 4 March 1907. The Cabinet was involved in discussions to form the Union of South Africa, with Botha, Smuts and Hull attending the 1908–09 National Convention as delegates, and which was finally achieved on 31 May 1910. The Cabinet was the only body of the Transvaal Colony from the granting of responsible self-government by letters patent on 6 December 1906, and was superseded by the Transvaal Provincial Executive Committee of the Transvaal Provincial Council with Rissik as the first Provincial Administrator.

Cabinet

Sources
 

Transvaal
Establishments in Transvaal
Transvaal Colony people
Cabinets of South Africa
Cabinets established in 1907
Cabinets disestablished in 1910